The Lourdaise is an endangered French breed of domestic cattle. It is named for the town of Lourdes, in the Hautes-Pyrénées département of the region of Occitanie, and originated in the surrounding country, particularly in the cantons of Argelès, Bagnères-de-Bigorre and Ossun. It was formerly a triple-purpose breed, kept for its milk, for its meat and for draught work. It was widely distributed in the Pyrénées of south-western France. It came close to extinction in the 1980s, but has since recovered following conservation efforts. It remains critically endangered.

History 

The Lourdaise originated in the rural areas surrounding Lourdes, now in the Hautes-Pyrénées département of Occitanie. It was particularly associated with the cantons of Argelès, Bagnères-de-Bigorre and Ossun, but was widely distributed in the area. It was the principal cattle breed of the traditional regions of the Bigorre and of the Lavedan. A herd-book was established in the 1890s, and in 1896 it held a total of 850 animals. At the beginning of the twentieth century there were some 25 000 head; more than 200 bulls were approved for public use as sires.

By 1983, only 30 Lourdaise cows remained. Conservation efforts were begun, with contributions from the Parc National des Pyrénées, the French Ministry of Agriculture, and the regional administration of Haute-Pyrénées.

The Lourdaise was listed as "critical-maintained" by the FAO in 2007. In 2014 the total population was reported to be 268.

Characteristics 

The Lourdaise is white or cream-coloured. The skin is white and the muzzle and mucous areas are pale. The inner side of the thigh and the surround of the eyes and of the muzzle is white.

Use 

The Lourdaise was formerly a triple-purpose breed, kept for its milk, for its meat and for draught work. There is enough milk for naturallyfed milk veal production.

References

Cattle breeds originating in France
Cattle breeds